Piasa...Devourer Of Men is a soundtrack album composed by American experimental rock band Sun City Girls, released in 1994 by Abduction Records.

Track listing

Personnel
Adapted from the Piasa...Devourer of Men liner notes.

Sun City Girls
 Alan Bishop – bass guitar
 Richard Bishop – guitar
 Charles Gocher – drums, percussion

Production and additional personnel
 Scott Colburn – production, engineering
 Sun City Girls – production

Release history

References

External links 
 

1994 soundtrack albums
Sun City Girls albums